Abish may refer to

Places in Iran
Abish Ahmad District 
Abish Ahmad, a city and the capital of Abish Ahmad District
Abish Ahmad Rural District 
Qeshlaq-e Hajj Abish (disambiguation), several villages

Other
Abish (name)
Abish-Kyand, a village in Azerbaijan
Abish (Book of Mormon), a woman in the Book of Mormon
Abish Kekilbayev, a Kazakh politician
Abish Khatun, ruler of Shiraz
Abish Mathew, an Indian comedian
Cecile Abish, an American sculptor and photographer
Walter Abish, an Austrian-born author